Ezequiel Adrián Cérica (born 20 October 1986) is an Argentine professional footballer who plays as a forward for CA Mitre.

Career
Cérica's career began with Temperley of Primera B Metropolitana in 2008. A year later, Cérica completed a move to Primera C Metropolitana's Excursionistas. Seventeen goals followed across forty-three matches in the 2009–10 campaign, with Excursionistas losing in the promotion play-off semi-finals to Talleres. Talleres, who subsequently lost in the finals, signed Cérica in June 2010. He scored fourteen goals in his sole season, with his ex-team eliminating his new team in the play-offs. Cérica rejoined Temperley in June 2011, before leaving for Ferrocarril Midland in the following January. Fifty-nine games and twenty-five goals came in tier four.

After two seasons with Ferrocarril Midland, Cérica departed having been signed by Deportivo Morón. He made his debut in a Primera B Metropolitana defeat away to Los Andes on 3 August 2013, which preceded his first goal for the club at the end of September against Fénix. Cérica joined Villa Dálmine ahead of the 2014 Primera B Metropolitana, a campaign which he finished with five goals as they won promotion. In total, he stayed with them for three years whilst scoring at least five goals in four straight seasons; including nine in 2016–17. Cérica agreed to sign for Los Andes in 2017, prior to sealing a transfer to Arsenal de Sarandí in 2018.

Career statistics
.

References

External links

1986 births
Living people
Sportspeople from Buenos Aires Province
Argentine footballers
Association football forwards
Primera B Metropolitana players
Primera C Metropolitana players
Primera Nacional players
Club Atlético Temperley footballers
CA Excursionistas players
Talleres de Remedios de Escalada footballers
Club Ferrocarril Midland players
Deportivo Morón footballers
Villa Dálmine footballers
Club Atlético Los Andes footballers
Arsenal de Sarandí footballers
Club Atlético Mitre footballers